The following lists the top 25 singles of 2018 in Australia from the Australian Recording Industry Association (ARIA) end-of-year singles chart.

"Youngblood" was the top selling single of 2018 in Australia, spending eight consecutive weeks at No. 1 through the year and becoming the first local song to top the End of Year Singles chart since Anthony Callea's "The Prayer" in 2005.

See also  
 List of number-one singles of 2018 (Australia) 
 List of top 10 singles in 2018 (Australia) 
 List of Top 25 albums for 2018 in Australia 
 2018 in music 
 ARIA Charts 
 List of Australian chart achievements and milestones

References 

Australian record charts
2018 in Australian music
Australia Top 25 Singles